A hemi-cuboctahedron is an abstract polyhedron, containing half the faces of a semiregular cuboctahedron.

It has 4 triangular faces and 3 square faces, 12 edges, and 6 vertices. It can be seen as a rectified hemi-octahedron or rectified hemi-cube. 

It can be realized as a projective polyhedron (a tessellation of the real projective plane by 4 triangles and 3 square), which can be visualized by constructing the projective plane as a hemisphere where opposite points along the boundary are connected.

Dual
Its dual polyhedron is a rhombic hemi-dodecahedron which has 7 vertices (1-7), 12 edges (a-l), and 6 rhombic faces (A-F).

Related polyhedra
It has a real presentation as a uniform star polyhedron, the tetrahemihexahedron.

See also 
Hemi-dodecahedron
Hemi-icosahedron

References

External links
 The hemicubeoctahedron

Projective polyhedra

eo:Duon-dekduedro